W. E. Hill & Sons (1880) is a London-based firm that specialises in violins and other string instruments, and bows. It was also known as William Ebsworth Hill & Sons or William E. Hill & Sons.

Overview
Founded by William Ebsworth Hill at Wardour Street in 1880 and moved to 38 New Bond Street in 1887, ten years later relocated to 140 New Bond Street. In 1887 built workshops in Hanwell and extended them in 1904. The name W. E. Hill & Sons is built on a long family history of violin making, going back to William Ebsworth's great-grandfather, Joseph Hill. The firm soon gained a widespread reputation for expertise and dealing in fine instruments. They were also established as makers of instruments, bows, cases and fittings. A Hill's Certificate of Authenticity is considered definitive worldwide throughout the firm's history and their publications on Stradivari and Guarneri are still industry standards.

Many fine craftsmen worked for the firm. For much of the 20th century, the Hill workshop employed England's best bow makers, who created bows renowned for character and consistency. Hill violins, cellos and cases are also highly regarded. Their other products included varnish cleaner, violin e-strings, rosin, peg paste, music stands, chinrests, and specialist tools.

Over the years many of the most celebrated instruments by Stradivari, Amati, and Guarneri passed through Hill & Sons. They built up one of the most notable collections of stringed instruments which can be seen at the Ashmolean Museum in Oxford, including the "Messiah" Stradivari from 1716.

In the mid-1970s Hills bought 'Havenfields' in Great Missenden, Buckinghamshire and moved to the workshop there.

W. E. Hill and Sons closed the workshop at Havenfields in 1992.

The owners and directors of W. E. Hill & Sons: Stefan-Peter Greiner, renowned violin maker, Simon Morris and Steven Smith, managing directors of J&A Beare,  Derek Wilson, Hill bowmaker, and Robert Brewer Young, distinguished luthier, have broad experience in expertise, appraisal, violin and bow making, restoration, and conservation.

Their acquisition of the company marked its return to London.  The W. E. Hill & Sons workshop is located in the historic coach house and stables of Burgh House from 1704 in London Hampstead.

Under the direction of Robert Brewer Young and Stefan-Peter Greiner, violins modelled after Stradivari - including the Messiah of 1716 - notable Bergonzis, and the work of Guarneri del Gesu are being made as part of the Hill heritage.

Derek Wilson, who joined Hill in 1978, oversees the making of bows that offer the excellence of an enduring English tradition.

Using the resources provided by the Hill archive, access to rare instruments and centuries of experience allows W. E. Hill & Sons to provide the music world with the finest tools for performance.

Auction record prices
 New York, October 16, 2013 – Tarisio Auctions, (New York) Violin Bow CHARLES LEGGATT FOR W.E. HILL & SONS, c. 1905 ex-Aaron Rosand mounted in Gold/Tortoise-Shell with fleur-de-lys motif US$15,600
 London, Oct 7, 2010 – Sotheby's of London Lot 35 Violin Bow, World Record for a Hill violin bow $15,899 £10,000 €11,538
 New York, Oct 18, 2009 – Tarisio Auctions Lot 414 Cello, 1893, World Record for a Hill Cello $54,000 £33,366 €36,311
 London Mar 11, 2008 – Sotheby's of London Lot 129 Cello Bow, World Record for a Hill cello bow $18,788 £9,375 €12,257 Filimonov Fine Violins

W. E. Hill & Sons Bow Makers
 Sam Allen (b. 1838 - d. 1914) (Hills 1880–1891) - no marking
 Sydney Yeoman (b. 1876 - d. 1948) (Hills 1890–1945) - marked with a single nick in the lower mortise
 William Napier (b. 1848 - d. 1932) (Hills 1891–1930) - no marking
 William Charles Retford (b. 1875 - d. 1970) (Hills 1892–1956) - marked with a single dot
 William Grieve Johnston (b. 1860 - d. 1944) (Hills 1894–1940) - before 1904 marked with downward nicks in the head mortise, after 1904 the nicks became horizontal
 Charles Leggatt (b. 1880 - d. 1917) (Hills 1895–1916) - marked with two nicks in the centre of the mortise
 Frank Napier (b. 1886 - d. 1969) (Hills 1900–1930) - marked with a pattern of three leaves
 Arthur Copley (b. 1903 - d. 1976) (Hills 1917–1976) - marked 1
 Edgar Bishop (b. 1904 - d. 1943) (Hills 1918–1943) - marked 2
 William Richard Retford (b. 1899 - d. 1960) (Hills 1919–1960) - marked with two dots
 Arthur Scarbrow (b. 1900 - d. 1953) (Hills 1919–1930) - marked 0
 Leslie Bailey (b. 1905 - d. 1984) (Hills 1919–1939) - marked 4
 Albert Leeson (b. 1903 - d. 1946) (Hills 1920–1946) - marked 3
 Arthur John Barnes (b. 1888 - d. 1945) (Hills 1920–1939) - marked 5
 Arthur Bultitude (b. 1908 - d. 1990) (Hills 1922–1961) - marked 6
 William Watson (b. 1930 - d. 2018) (Hills 1945–1962) - marked 7
 Ronald Harding (b. 1932 - d. 2014) (Hills 1946–1956) - marked 9
 Arthur Brown (b. 1903 - d.?) (Hills 1946–1968) - marked 10 or X
 Malcolm M Taylor (b. 1933 - d. 2012) (Hills 1949–1973) - marked 8
 David Taylor (b. 1940) (Hills 1956–1966) - marked 13
 Alan Willis (b. 1942) (Hills 1957–1962) - marked 11
 Garner Wilson (b. 1944 - d. 2013) (Hills 1960–1966) - marked 12
 John Clutterbuck (b. 1949) (Hills 1964–1971) - marked 14
 Brian Alvey (b. 1949) (Hills 1966–1978) - marked 15
 Stephen Bristow (b. 1952) (Hills 1967–1972) - marked 16
 David Earl (b. 1953 - d. 1982) (Hills 1969–1978) - marked 18
 Ian Shepherd (b. 1955) (Hills 1971–1975) - marked 17
 Matthew Coltman (b. 1955) (Hills 1977–1981) - marked 19
 John Stagg (b. 1954) (Hills 1977–1983) - marked 20
 Derek Wilson (b. 1962) (Hills 1978–1985) - no marking
 Tim Baker (b. 1962) (Hills 1981–1984) - no marking

W. E. Hill and Sons Violin Makers

 Charles François Langonet (b. 1860 - d. 1929) (Hills 1879–1929)
 Joseph Prunier
 August Delunet
 Joseph Somney
 Edward Wayland
 James Jeffreys
 Alfred Charles Langonet (b. 1917 - d. 1973)

Bibliography

References

 W.E. Hill & Sons (A Tribute), Richard Sadler 1996 
 Giovanni Paolo Maggini: His Life and Work (1892) Henry, Arthur & Alfred Hill
 https://archive.org/details/giopaolomagginih00hugg
 The Hill Bow Makers 1880-1962, John Milnes and Derek Wilson 2016,

External links

 Hill Bows
 Pegturning tales (from The Strad)DEAD LINK
 Books on W E Hill & Sons (Ealing Strings)
 Internet edition of the Hills' book on Stradivari (Cello Heaven)
 Anecdote about William Hill identifying a Stradivarius from an interview with Henry Brant
 Example of a Certificate of Authenticity
 W.E. Hill & Sons: on the Mt. Parnassus of the art of violin making

Bow makers
British luthiers
Musical instrument manufacturing companies based in London